Lakin is an unincorporated community in Mason County, West Virginia, United States.

The community was named after one M. Lakin, a state official.

Infrastructure
The West Virginia Division of Corrections and Rehabilitation operates the women's prison Lakin Correctional Center in Lakin. West Virginia Department of Health and Human Resources has operated a 114-bed long term care nursing home, the Lakin Hospital, on the grounds of the former Lakin State Hospital since 1979. Previously, the state run Lakin Industrial School operated from 1924 until 1956. 

American Electric Power operates a sub-critical 138-69KV electrical substation located in Lakin.

References

Unincorporated communities in Mason County, West Virginia
Unincorporated communities in West Virginia